The Izu Kyūkō Line is a privately owned railway line of the Izukyū Corporation in Shizuoka Prefecture, Japan.

The line approximately parallels the eastern coast of the Izu Peninsula, a tourist district noted for its numerous hot spring resorts, and golf courses, between Itō Station in Itō and Izukyū Shimoda Station in Shimoda. The line opened in 1961.

Since March 13, 2010, PASMO and Suica cards are accepted on the line.

Basic data
Track: single
Signalling: Automatic (ATS-Si, compatible with East Japan Railway Company (JR East) ATS-SN.)

History
Initial plans called for the Japanese National Railways (JNR) to build a spur line linking Atami on the Tōkaidō Main Line with Shimoda. However, funding was limited in the 1930s due to a combination of a tight fiscal policy under Prime Minister Osachi Hamaguchi during the Great Depression, and a number of technical issues.

Both sections were electrified at 1500 VDC when opened. Further work was delayed, and then canceled due to the outbreak of World War II.

Construction south of Itō resumed when the private-sector Tokyu Corporation acquired the rights to complete the line to Shimoda and established the Izukyū Corporation to manage construction and operations of this section. The line to Shimoda opened in 1961.

Operation
The northern terminal station for the Izu Kyūkō Line is at Ito Station, from which local trains depart for the southern terminal station of Izukyū-Shimoda. However, several varieties of limited express trains operated by JR East originate at Tokyo Station travel via the Itō Line tracks to Ito, and then terminate at Izukyū-Shimoda. These include the Odoriko and Super View Odoriko named trains. Similarly, the Resort Odoriko operated by the Izu Kyūkō Line also makes the same run, but using different rolling stock.

Station list

Rolling Stock

Current

Izukyu 2100 series,
Izukyu 8000 series,
E257-2000/2500 series

Future
Izukyu 3000 series (Former 209-2000/2100 series)

Former
185 series

See also

List of railway lines in Japan

References
This article incorporates material from the corresponding article in the Japanese Wikipedia

External links 
  

 
Izukyū Corporation
Railway lines in Japan
Rail transport in Shizuoka Prefecture
Railway lines opened in 1961
1067 mm gauge railways in Japan